Rosa Juliet Flanagan (born 28 February 1996) is a runner from New Zealand competing in the 3000 metres steeplechase. She represented her country at the 2015 World Championships in Beijing without qualifying for the final.

Competition record

Personal bests
Outdoor
1500 metres – 4:14.19 (Wellington 2015)
One mile – 4:38.32 (Burnaby 2014)
3000 metres – 9:07.85 (Wellington 2015)
5000 metres – 15:52.10 (Auckland 2015)
3000 metres steeplechase – 9:41.42 (Melbourne 2015)

References

External links

1996 births
Living people
New Zealand female steeplechase runners
New Zealand female middle-distance runners
World Athletics Championships athletes for New Zealand
Place of birth missing (living people)
Competitors at the 2015 Summer Universiade